Jewels 10th Ring was a mixed martial arts (MMA) event held by MMA promotion Jewels. It hosted the opening round of the second Rough Stone Grand Prix.

Background
On , Jewels announced that the event would begin the second Rough Stone Grand Prix.

Ham's replacement was to be determined with the bout between Celine Haga and Saori Ishioka.

Sixteen-year-old kickboxer Mizuki Inoue made her mixed martial arts debut on the card as part of the -56 kg bracket of the Rough Stone Grand Prix.

The weigh-ins were held one day prior to the event. It was later announced that Ham would return to Jewels in December to reclaim her place in the Lightweight Queen Tournament semi-final. As a result, the bout between Ishioka and Haga was changed to a regular match.

Results
Opening fight: Jewels amateur rules -48 kg bout, 4 min / 1 R
 Asami Higa (S-KEEP) vs.  Sachiko Togashi (TEAM ☆ SPIRITS)
Draw at 4:00 of round 1.

1st match: Jewels official rules -52 kg bout, 5 min / 2 R
 Saori Ishioka (Zendokai Koganei) vs.  Celine Haga (Hellboy Hansen MMA)
Ishioka defeated Haga by decision (3-0).

2nd match: Jewels grappling rules -52 kg, 1 day tournament semi-finals, 4 min / 2R
 Yuko Oya (DEEP Official Gym Impact) vs.  Asami Kodera (Purebred Kawaguchi Redips)
Oya defeated Kodera by submission (armbar) at 2:22 of round 2.

3rd match: Jewels grappling rules -52 kg, 1 day tournament semi-finals, 4 min / 2R
 Emi Tomimatsu (Paraestra Matsudo) vs.  Ayaka Hamasaki (Abe Ani Combat Club)
Hamasaki defeated Tomimatsu by submission (armbar) at 2:34 of round 2.

4th match: Rough Stone GP 2010 -56 kg semi-finals, Jewels official rules, 5 min / 2 R
 Asako Saioka (U-File Camp Gifu) vs.  Harumi (Blue Dog Gym)
Saioka defeated Harumi by KO (punch) at 2:31 of round 1.

5th match: Rough Stone GP 2010 -56 kg semi-finals, Jewels official rules, 5 min / 2 R
 Emi Murata (Abe Ani Combat Club) vs.  Mizuki Inoue (Karate-do Shiro Shin-kai)
Inoue defeated Murata by submission (armbar) at 2:58 of round 2.

6th match: Rough Stone GP 2010 -48 kg semi-finals, Jewels official rules, 5 min / 2 R
 Kikuyo Ishikawa (Reversal Gym Yokohama Ground Slam) vs.  Misaki Ozawa (Zendokai Matsumoto)
Ishikawa defeated Ozawa by submission (armbar) at 2:24 of round 1.

7th match: Rough Stone GP 2010 -48 kg semi-finals, Jewels official rules, 5 min / 2 R
 Yukiko Seki (Fight Chix) vs.  Yoko Kagoshima (Shinagawa CS)
Seki defeated Kagoshima by decision (3-0).

8th match: Rough Stone GP 2010 -52 kg semi-finals, Jewels official rules, 5 min / 2 R
 Hiroko Kitamura (Zendokai Koganei) vs.  Rina Tomita (Abe Ani Combat Club)
Kitamura defeated Tomita by decision (3-0).

9th match: Rough Stone GP 2010 -52 kg semi-finals, Jewels official rules, 5 min / 2 R
 Mai Ichii (Ice Ribbon) vs.  Miyo Yoshida (freelancer)
Ichii defeated Yoshida by decision (3-0).

10th match: Jewels grappling rules -52 kg, 1 day tournament final, 4 min / 2R
 Yuko Oya (DEEP Official Gym Impact) vs.  Ayaka Hamasaki (Abe Ani Combat Club)
Hamasaki defeated Oya by submission (armbar) at 2:45 of round 1.

11th match: Shoot boxing rules -53 kg bout, 2 min / 3 R (extension 2 R)
 Sakura Nomura (Club Barbarian Impact) vs.  Yoshimi Ohama (NJKF / Inspired Motion)
Nomura defeated Ohama by unanimous decision (30-27, 30-27, 30-27).

12th match: Jewels official rules -58 kg bout, 5 min / 2 R
 Miki Morifuji (T-Blood) vs.  Aya Koyama (Fight Chix)
Morifuji defeated Koyama by submission (rear naked choke) at 1:51 of round 1.

References

External links
Official results at Jewels official blog 
Event results at Sherdog
Event results (fights 1, 10-12) at God Bless the Ring 
Event results (fights 2-9) at God Bless the Ring 
Event results at kakutoh.com 
Event results at sportsnavi.com 
Event results at Bout Review 

Jewels (mixed martial arts) events
2010 in mixed martial arts
Mixed martial arts in Japan
Sports competitions in Tokyo
2010 in Japanese sport